The 81st Pennsylvania House of Representatives District is located in central Pennsylvania and has been represented by Rich Irvin since 2015.

District profile
The 81st District is located in Franklin County and Huntingdon County and includes the following areas: 

Franklin County

Fannett Township
Letterkenny Township
Lurgan Township
Metal Township
Orrstown
Shippensburg (Franklin County Portion)
Southampton Township
St. Thomas Township

Huntingdon County

Alexandria
Barree Township
Brady Township
Broad Top City
Carbon Township
Cass Township
Cassville
Clay Township
Coalmont
Cromwell Township
Dublin Township
Dudley
Henderson Township
Hopewell Township
Huntingdon
Jackson Township
Juniata Township
Lincoln Township
Logan Township
Mapleton
Marklesburg
Mill Creek
Miller Township
Morris Township
Mount Union
Oneida Township
Orbisonia
Penn Township
Petersburg
Porter Township
Rockhill
Saltillo
Shade Gap
Shirley Township
Shirleysburg
Smithfield Township
Springfield Township
Spruce Creek Township
Tell Township
Three Springs
Todd Township
Union Township
Walker Township
West Township
Wood Township

Representatives

References

Government of Centre County, Pennsylvania
Government of Huntingdon County, Pennsylvania
Government of Mifflin County, Pennsylvania
81